Sangtab (also Romanized as Sangtāb and Sang Tāb) is a village in Talarpey Rural District, in the Central District of Simorgh County, Mazandaran Province, Iran. At the 2006 census, its population was 786, in 215 families.

References 

Populated places in Simorgh County